Antoine-François Brisson (25 October 1728, in Paris – 1796, in Lyon) was an 18th-century French lawyer.

An inspector of commerce and manufacture for the financial district of Lyon, Brisson published Manière de retirer de la pomme de terre la poudre blanche que l'on nomme amidon, fécule farine, Lyon, 1779 and Mémoires historiques et économiques sur le Beaujolais, Lyon, 1795.

He wrote the articles toilerie and Suisses, privileges des Suisses en France pour leur commerce for the Encyclopédie by Diderot.

His son, Barnabé Brisson (1777–1828), was an engineer.

Sources 
 Joseph-Marie Quérard, La Littérature française contemporaine. XIXe, t. 1, Paris, Daguin Frères, 1842, p. 533.

References

External links 
 Antoine-françois Brisson on Wikisource
 Notice on Persée

18th-century French lawyers
Contributors to the Encyclopédie (1751–1772)
Lawyers from Lyon
1728 births
1796 deaths